City of Brighton may refer to:

 City of Brighton (South Australia)
 City of Brighton (Victoria), Australia
 City of Brighton and Hove, East Sussex, England
 Brighton, town in England

See also
Brighton (disambiguation)